Lucilla (148 or 150 – 182) was the second daughter and third child of Roman Emperor Marcus Aurelius.

Lucilla may also refer to:

People
 Lucilla Agosti (born 1978), Italian radio and television presenter and actress
 Lucilla Andrews (1919-2006), British writer
 Lucilla Andreucci (born 1969), Italian long-distance runner
 Lucilla de Arcangelis, Italian statistical physicist
 Lucilla Boari (born 1997), Italian recurve archer 
 Lucilla Green Cheney (1853-1878), American physician and missionary
 Lucilla Galeazzi (born 1950), Italian folk singer
 Lucilla Morlacchi (1936-2014), Italian film, television and stage actress
 Lucilla Perrotta (born 1975), Italian professional beach volleyball
 Lucilla Poston, British physiologist
 Lucilla Udovich (1930-1999), American soprano of Croatian ancestry
 Lucilla Wright (born 1979), former English field hockey international

Fauna
 Daddala lucilla, species of moth in the family Erebidae
 Euchloe lucilla, small butterfly of the family Pieridae
 Lucilla (gastropod), a genus of very small air-breathing land snails
 Lucilla scintilla, species of minute air-breathing land snail
 Lucilla singleyana, species of minute air-breathing land snail

Other uses
 Lucilla (album), an album by jazz musician Marco Di Meco
 Badia delle Sante Flora e Lucilla, Medieval abbey in Arezzo, Tuscany, Italy